La CQ (English: The CQ) is a Mexican television series created by Pedro Ortíz de Pinedo. Recorded at RCTV Studios in Caracas, it is a co-production between Televisa and Cartoon Network Latin America, making it also the first local original live-action series. The show's original broadcasting time was 11:00 AM, 4:00 PM and 6:00 PM; currently it is broadcast Monday through Friday on Cartoon Network in Latin America, and on Canal 5 in Mexico from 5:00-6:00 PM. The show follows a group of friends as they experience conflicts throughout their middle school years.

The series first premiered on August 6, 2012, and then returned with the Season 2 on December 6, 2012. In September 2013, it started airing in the United States on UniMás' weekend morning lineup.

Plot
La CQ tells the story of eight friends at the middle school called Constantino Quijano. The friends: Angel, Clara, Beto, Monche, Jenny, Danny, Adri, and Roque often go through funny conflicts causing great stories, misunderstandings, but more importantly always showing the value of friendship and being a team.

Characters
 Ángel del Río (played by Emiliano Flores): Ángel is Adri's older brother, and is usually not the smartest of the fraternity. He is the captain of La CQ's soccer team and dreams of one day being a professional player. He is friendly and considered very handsome by the girls of La CQ. He is Clara's boyfriend and Beto's best friend.
Clara Licona (played by Alejandra "Ale" Müller): Ángel's girlfriend (they start secretly dating at the end of Season 1), and Adri's best friend. She is the new student at La CQ. She is pretty but sometimes considered a little cheesy, especially when it comes to talking about Ángel. Her biggest enemy is Jenny and is the most "normal" out of the gang.
 Roberto "Beto" Bautista (played by Benny Emmanuel): Beto is the smartest not only of the group but the whole school, although he is not considered very handsome. He is best friends with Ángel and Monche and has a crush on Danny.
 Ramón “Monche” Barragán (played by Harold Azuara): Monche is the most naive and the comedian of the group. He often tells nonsensical jokes or says silly comments and sometimes spies on the cheerleaders or sneaks into the girls' restroom. He also has a habit of smoothening his hair.
 Maria Juana "Jenny" Pinto del Rostro (played by Fernanda Urdapilleta): Jenny is the captain of the school's cheerleaders and is very mean. She is the daughter of La CQ's principal, and has a cousin named Danny (who she's always bossing around). She has a crush on Ángel, but he doesn't like her back, making her share a rivalry with Clara and Adri. She is considered the most girly and likes to be the center of attention. Even though she is a mean girl, the rest consider her a friend of the crew. Her biggest secret is her love for tacos which only Danny knows.
 Daniela "Danny" Pinto del Rostro (played by Ferny Graciano): Danny is the other nitwit of the gang. She is pretty naive, distracted, and doesn't catch on very fast. She has a crush on Beto and carries a doll named "Clementina". She is Jenny's cousin and is always following her orders. She is the niece of La CQ's principal and a very good friend of the crew.
 Adriana "Adri" del Río  (played by Josselyn Zuckerman): Adri is Ángel's younger sister, Clara's best friend and, most of the time, the group's voice of reason. She hates being feminine and is more of a tomboy, something Jenny always makes fun of. She doesn't like when Roque picks on her friends and always stands up to him, but secretly she has feelings for him and is only trying to change his ways.
 "Roque" Villalón Pérez (played by Luis Fernando Ceballos): Roque is the school's bully always picking on smaller children, but mostly Monche and Beto. Jenny, being the principal's daughter, always uses him to get what she wants. Roque has failed at least three times, which leads to him being in the same grade level as the rest. He's friends with the Del Rio siblings (more of a frenemy in Ángel's case) even when the rest of the group dislikes him for his attitude. He always shows his true self whenever he's alone with Adri, proving he's a very sensible and kind person.

Commercial production
The characters in La CQ were in commercial campaigns for Cartoon Network's: "Stop Bullying Speak Up", were also used to Cartoon Network Latin America bumpers to mark commercial spaces, and to start series, these bumpers were removed from the air in October 2012. After all, both Cartoon Network and Televisa received soon negative criticisms, especially from the first one's fans.

Reception
The series received criticism since its launch. Audiences and critics criticized the plot of the episodes, the poor performances, the effects and the humor, considered as very simple. It is also criticized by Hispanics that the design of the school is completely similar to American schools, although the series is set in Mexico. The series is considered by many to be a very bad series and too childish. Monche's humor is considered very simplistic and boring, and also criticize the excessive use of laugh track. A Movie and a Brazilian Version were announced at the time by Pedro Ortiz de Pinedo but they never aired in the channel and nothing was known about them after that. until 2022 when Cartoon Network President Michael Ouweleen announced that all Live-Action Productions were scrapped.

Accolades

References

External links
 Official website
 La CQ in Internet Movie Database
 La CQ in FilmAffinity

Mexican television sitcoms
2012 Mexican television series debuts
2014 Mexican television series endings
2010s Mexican television series
Cartoon Network original programming
Television series by Televisa
Television series about teenagers